Diaphonic may denote a relation to:
Diaphoneme and diaphones, in linguistics
Diaphonia or parallel harmony, in music
Diaphone, a type of organ pipe or horn